"That Certain Feeling" is a 1925 song composed by George Gershwin, with lyrics by Ira Gershwin.

It was introduced by Allen Kearns and Queenie Smith in the 1925 musical Tip-Toes.  It was later used as the title of a 1956 Bob Hope film when it was performed during the opening credits by Pearl Bailey and later reprised by Bob Hope

Notable recordings
Dorothy Dickson and Allen Kearns, Jack Clarke, G. Myddleton - rec. September 9, 1926 - released as Columbia 91298, matrix WA 1887
Paul Whiteman and His Orchestra - recorded on December 24, 1925 for Victor Records, catalog No. 19920. A popular version in 1926.
Josephine Baker - rec. 1926 - released as Odeon 49.171
Shirley Ross - for the Decca 78rpm album George Gershwin Songs, Vol. 1 (1939).
Ella Fitzgerald - rec. 1959 - from Ella Fitzgerald Sings the George and Ira Gershwin Songbook
George Gershwin - rec. 1926
Layton & Johnstone - rec. November 1926 - released as Columbia WA 4530
Pearl Bailey - for her album Singing & Swinging (1960).
Les Brown and Jo Ann Greer - recorded May 18, 1956 - released as Capitol 3463.

References

Songs with music by George Gershwin
Songs with lyrics by Ira Gershwin
1925 songs